LA Alumínios–LA Sport is a Portuguese UCI Continental cycling team based in Paredes. It participates in the UCI Continental Circuits.

Team roster

Major wins

2000
Stage 1 Volta a Portugal, Miguel Ángel Suárez
2003
Stage 2 Volta a Portugal, Alberto Benito
Stage 2 GP CTT Correios, Alberto Benito
2004
Stage 1 Volta ao Algarve, Alberto Benito
Stage 1 Volta ao Alentejo, Alberto Benito
Stage 4 GP Torres Vedras, Alberto Benito
2005
Overall Volta ao Algarve, Hugo Sabido
Stage 5, Hugo Sabido
Overall GP Torres Vedras, Gerardo Fernández
Stage 2, Gerardo Fernández
GP Area Metropolitana de Vigo, Francisco García Rodríguez
GP Ciudad de Vigo, José Carlos Rodrigues
2008
Stage 3 Circuit de Lorraine, Eladio Jiménez
Stage 2 GP CTT Correios, Eladio Jiménez
Overall Vuelta a Chihuahua, Francisco Mancebo
Stage 8 Tour of South China Sea, Micael Isidoro
2009
Stages 1 & 8 Volta de São Paulo, Héctor Aguilar
2010
Stage 3 GP Torres Vedras, José João Mendes
2011
Stage 2 Volta ao Alentejo, Bruno Sancho
Prologue Volta a Portugal, Hugo Sabido
Stage 3 Volta a Portugal, Hernâni Brôco
2013
Stage 5 Volta ao Alentejo, António Carvalho
2014
Mountain classification Volta a Portugal, António Carvalho
Stage 4, Edgar Pinto
Stage 1 GP Torres Vedras, Edgar Pinto
2015
Mountain classification Volta a Portugal, Bruno Silva

References

External links

Cycling teams based in Portugal
UCI Continental Teams (Europe)
Cycling teams established in 1995
1995 establishments in Portugal